John Charles Fenton (5 June 1921 – 27 December 2008) was a British Church of England priest and New Testament scholar. He was Principal of Lichfield Theological College from 1958 to 1965, Principal of St Chad's College, Durham University from 1965 to 1978, and a Canon of Christ Church, Oxford from 1978 to 1991.

Early life and education
Fenton was born on 5 June 1921 in Liverpool, England, to Cornelius O'Connor Fenton and his wife Agnes Claudina Fenton (née Ingoldby). His father was a vicar. He was educated at St Edward's School, then an all-boys private boarding school in Oxford.

In 1940, he matriculated at Queen's College, Oxford to study theology. He was taught by the college chaplain, V. K. Johnson, and the New Testament by R. H. Lightfoot. He had come to Oxford a staunch Anglo-Catholic, but had his horizons broadened and was strongly influenced by the theology of Søren Kierkegaard. He graduated from the University of Oxford with a Bachelor of Arts (BA) degree in 1943: as per tradition, his BA was promoted to a Master of Arts (MA Oxon) degree in 1947. Then, from 1943 to 1944, he trained for Holy Orders at Lincoln Theological College, a Church of England theological college in the Central tradition.

Career
Fenton's ecclesiastical career was mainly focused on teaching and working within the Church of England's theological colleges. However, he also served in parish ministry, and wrote a substantial number of books for academic and general audiences.

Fenton was ordained in the Church of England as a deacon in 1944 and as a priest in 1945. He served his curacy at All Saints Church, Hindley in the Diocese of Liverpool from 1944 to 1947. He then returned to Lincoln Theological College, where he had trained for ordination, having been appointed its chaplain in 1947 and promoted to sub-warden in 1951. At the college, he taught mainly on the New Testament. He returned to parish ministry, and was Vicar of Wentworth in the Diocese of Sheffield between 1954 and 1958.

In 1958, Fenton began his career as a senior member of the church hierarchy, having been appointed Principal of Lincoln Theological College. Lincoln was a community of both young more mature ordinands: in addition to teaching them the New Testament, he saw it as his duty to challenge their faith. In 1965, he left Lincoln for the last time having been appointed Principal of St Chad's College, Durham, which was both a theological college and a college of the university. During his time in charge of St Chad's, the college ceased its formal training of ordinands for the Church of England, and he led its integration into the wider university with students reading for all degrees offered by Durham University.

Views
A scholar of the New Testament, he did not superscribe to Biblical literalism: "he understood the Gospels to consist largely of the teaching material of the earliest Christian communities, rather than historical or biographical fact". He believed that layers of later hands had to be stripped back from the Bible, and that the first-century context of Christ's teaching had to be recognised to truly understand them.

Works

Books

Articles and Chapters

References

1921 births
2008 deaths
20th-century English Anglican priests
New Testament scholars
Clergy from Liverpool
People educated at St Edward's School, Oxford
British biblical scholars
Anglican biblical scholars
Staff of Lichfield Theological College
Principals of St Chad's College, Durham
Academics of Durham University